Torsa may refer to:

The Torsa River, which runs through Tibet, Bhutan, India and Bangladesh
Torsa, an island in Scotland
TORSA, an acronym for TransOral Robotic Sleep Apnea surgery